The year 1799 in architecture involved some significant events.

Buildings and structures

Buildings

 May 9 – St. Mark's Church in-the-Bowery in New York City, built by John McComb, Jr., is consecrated.
 Gracie Mansion in New York City, designed by John McComb, Jr., is built.
 The Chester Shot Tower, a grade-II*-listed shot tower, is built in the Boughton district of Chester, England.
 In New Orleans, The Cabildo (first phase) is completed (begun in 1795).
 Reconstruction of Town Hall, Vilnius, by Laurynas Gucevičius is completed.
 Broadway Tower, Worcestershire, England, designed by James Wyatt, is completed.
 Grand Pump Room, Bath, England, designed by Thomas Baldwin and John Palmer, is completed
 Hjo Church in Sweden is completed.

Births
 Approximate date – William Thomas, English-born architect working in Canada (died 1860)

Deaths
 February 6 – Étienne-Louis Boullée, French neoclassical architect (born 1728)
 April 17 – Richard Jupp, English architect (born 1728)
 June 11 – Joaquín Toesca, Italian-born architect working in Chile (born 1745)
 August 31 – Nicolas-Henri Jardin, French neoclassical architect (born 1720)

References

Architecture
Years in architecture
18th-century architecture